River Cafe may refer to:

 River Café (Brooklyn), New York, United States
 River Cafe (Puerto Vallarta), Jalisco, Mexico
 The River Café (London), United Kingdom